The Battle of Alazan Creek, occurred on the banks of Alazan Creek in Spanish Texas on June 20, 1813, during the Mexican War of Independence. The location is today in Bexar County, Texas, in the United States, just west of downtown San Antonio (formerly San Antonio del Bejar).

See also
 Salado Creek
 Battle of Rosillo Creek
 Battle of Medina
 Manuel María de Salcedo
 Gutiérrez–Magee Expedition
 History of Texas
 Samuel Kemper
 Reuben Kemper

Sources
 
 

Alazan Creek
Alazan Creek
1813 in New Spain
Alazan Creek
June 1813 events